The Broken Coin is a 1915 American adventure-mystery film serial directed by Francis Ford.  This serial is presumed to be lost.

Cast
 Grace Cunard - Kitty Gray
 Francis Ford - Count Frederick
 Eddie Polo - Roleau
 Harry Schumm - King Michael II
 Ernest Shields - Count Sacchio
 John Ford - Sacchio's Accomplice (as Jack Ford)
W.C. Canfield - Gorgas the Outlaw
 Reese Gardiner - The Apache
 Doc Crane - Pawnbroker
 Harry Mann - Servant
 Victor Goss - Servant (as Vic Goss)
 Lew Short - Prime Minister (as Lewis Short)
 George Utell - Henchman (as G.J. Uttal)
 Bert Wilson - Confidante
Mina Cunard - King's Sweetheart
 Carl Laemmle - Editor-in-Chief
 Jack Holt - Captain Williams
 Mark Fenton - King of Grahaffen
 John George- uncredited

Chapter titles
The Broken Coin
The Satan of the Sands
When the Throne Rocked
The Face at the Window
The Underground Foe
A Startling Discovery
Between Two Fires
The Prison in the Palace
Room 22
Cornered
The Clash of Arms
A Cry in the Dark
War
On the Battlefield
 Either
The Deluge
Kitty in Danger
The Castaways
The Underground City
The Sacred Fire
Between Two Fires
A Timely Rescue
An American Queen

See also
 List of film serials
 List of film serials by studio
List of lost films

References

External links

1915 films
1915 adventure films
1915 lost films
American silent serial films
American mystery films
American black-and-white films
Lost American films
Films directed by Francis Ford
Films with screenplays by Grace Cunard
Universal Pictures film serials
Lost adventure films
1910s American films
Silent adventure films
Silent mystery films
1910s English-language films